Richard's Castle (Shropshire) is a civil parish in Shropshire, England.  It contains 30 listed buildings that are recorded in the National Heritage List for England.  Of these, one is listed at Grade I, the highest of the three grades, two are at Grade II*, the middle grade, and the others are at Grade II, the lowest grade.  The parish lies to the northeast of the village of Richard's Castle.  It contains the villages of Overton and Woofferton and smaller settlements, and is otherwise rural.  Most of the listed buildings in the parish are houses, cottages, farmhouses and farm buildings, the earliest of which are timber framed.  There are two country houses that are listed, together with associated structures.  The other listed buildings include a public house, an aqueduct, a bridge, a former toll house, two mileposts, and a church.


Key

Buildings

References

Citations

Sources

Lists of buildings and structures in Shropshire